Harifian is a specialized regional cultural development of the Epipalaeolithic of the Negev Desert. It corresponds to the latest stages of the Natufian culture.

History
Like the Natufian, Harifian is characterized by semi-subterranean houses. These are often more elaborate than those found at Natufian sites. For the first time arrowheads are found among the stone tool kit. 

The Harifian dates to between approximately 10,800/10,500bp and 10,000/10,200bp. It is restricted to the Sinai and Negev, and is probably broadly contemporary with the Late Natufian or Pre-Pottery Neolithic A (PPNA). 

Microlithic points are a characteristic feature of the industry, with the Harif point being both new and particularly diagnostic – Bar-Yosef (1998) suggests that it is an indication of improved hunting techniques. Lunates, isosceles and other triangular forms were backed with retouch, and some Helwan lunates are found. This industry contrasts with the Desert Natufian which did not have the roughly triangular points in its assemblage.

There are two main groups within the Harifian. One group consists of ephemeral base camps in the north of Sinai and western Negev, where stone points comprise up to 88% of all microliths, accompanied by only a few lunates and triangles. The other group consists of base camps and smaller campsites in the Negev and features a greater number of lunates and triangles than points. These sites probably represent functional rather than chronological differences. The presence of Khiam points in some sites indicates that there was communication with other areas in the Levant at this time."

Harifian has close connections with the late Mesolithic cultures of Fayyum and the Eastern Deserts of Egypt, whose tool assemblage resembles that of the Harifian. Fusion with animal domestication elements of the Pre-Pottery Neolithic B (PPNB) culture is hypothesised by Juris Zarins, to have led to the circum-Arabian Nomadic Pastoral Complex, a group of cultures that invented nomadic pastoralism, and may have been the original culture which spread Proto-Semitic languages throughout the region.

See also 
 Archaeology of Israel

References 

Archaeological cultures in Egypt
Archaeological cultures of the Near East
Archaeological cultures in Israel
Epipalaeolithic cultures
Negev
9th-millennium BC establishments